The Ropucha class (Polish for Toad), Soviet designation Project 775, is a class of landing ships (large landing ship in Soviet classification) built in Poland for the Soviet Navy. The ships were built in Poland in the Stocznia Północna shipyards in Gdańsk. Designed for beach landings, they can carry a 450-ton cargo. Up to 25 armored personnel carriers can be embarked.

While designed for roll-on/roll-off operations, they can also be loaded using dockside cranes. For this purpose there is a long sliding hatch-cover above the bow section for access to the vehicle deck. There are no facilities for helicopters.

In total, 28 ships of this type were commissioned from 1975 to 1991. The last three ships were of the improved variant Project 775M, also called Ropucha II. These have improved defensive armament and accommodation for an increased number of troops.

Operational history

Most of the ships became part of the Russian Navy after the dissolution of the Soviet Union. They were used for landing troops at the Georgian port of Poti during the 2008 South Ossetia war and for deliveries of cargo during the Russian military intervention in the Syrian Civil War.

One ship of the class was delivered to the South Yemen in 1979 and served the Yemeni Navy until 2002, before it was sold as a civilian cargo named Sam of Yemen. It was the only unit of this class in service outside the former Soviet Union.

On 3 August 2012, international media reported that three vessels of the class, Aleksandr Otrakovskiy, Georgiy Pobedonosets and Kondopoga would visit the Russian naval base in Tartus, Syria. The ships were part of the Northern Fleet. Earlier reports, quoting a source at the Russian general staff, said the ships would spend a few days in Tartus and would take on fresh supplies of food and water. British media added that the ships each had up to 120 marines on board.

The Russian defence ministry left open the possibility that the ships might dock there at some point for logistical reasons, saying they had every right to do so. The General Staff source, who was not named, had said that after calling in at Tartus they would head for the Bosporus and the Russian Black Sea port of Novorossiysk. 

From 2013 on, ten Ropucha-class ships, gathered from all four Russian fleets, were used to transport military equipment from Novorosiysk to Tartus in Syria, during an intervention in Syrian civil war, along with Ropucha-class ships. 

The Ukrainian Navy's only ship of the class, Kostiantyn Olshansky, was reportedly seized by Russian troops and accepted into service with the Russian Navy after the Annexation of Crimea by the Russian Federation in March 2014.

All ships of the Russia's Black Sea Fleet, namely , Novocherkassk, Yamal and Azov were modernized with installation of the Tsentavr-NM2S, Auriga and Cobham SAILOR satellite phones.

Operations 

In the 2021/2022 tensions between Russia and Ukraine leading up to the 2022 Russian invasion of Ukraine, the landing ships Korolev, Minsk, Kaliningrad, Pyotr Morgunov, Georgy Pobedonosets, and Olenegorsky Gornyak  from the Baltic and Northern fleets departed their base and passed through the Dardanelles Strait in February 2022 for exercises in the Black Sea.

Project 775 construction data

See also
 List of ships of the Soviet Navy
 List of ships of Russia by project number
 List of active Russian Navy ships

References

Bibliography

External links

 Russian Littoral Warfare Ships at Hazegray.org
 Yemeni Navy at Hazegray.org
 All Ropucha Class Landing Ships - Complete Ship List at Russianships.info

Amphibious warfare vessel classes
 Ropucha class landing ship
Poland–Soviet Union relations
Amphibious warfare vessels of the Soviet Navy
Amphibious warfare vessels of the Russian Navy
Naval ships built in Poland for export